Balmaceda is a genus of jumping spiders that was first described by George Peckham & Elizabeth Peckham in 1894.

Species
 it contains eleven species, found in Central America, Argentina, Colombia, Brazil, Ecuador, and Mexico:
Balmaceda abba Edwards & Baert, 2018 – Ecuador (Galapagos Is.)
Balmaceda anulipes Soares, 1942 – Brazil
Balmaceda biteniata Mello-Leitão, 1922 – Brazil
Balmaceda chickeringi Roewer, 1951 – Panama
Balmaceda distans (Banks, 1924) – Ecuador (Galapagos Is.)
Balmaceda minor (F. O. Pickard-Cambridge, 1901) – Mexico to El Salvador
Balmaceda nigrosecta Mello-Leitão, 1945 – Colombia, Argentina
Balmaceda picta Peckham & Peckham, 1894 (type) – Guatemala to Colombia
Balmaceda reducta Chickering, 1946 – Panama
Balmaceda turneri Chickering, 1946 – Panama
Balmaceda vera Mello-Leitão, 1917 – Brazil

References

External links
 Photographs of Balmaceda species from Brazil

Salticidae genera
Salticidae
Spiders of Central America
Spiders of South America